The white-naped brushfinch (Atlapetes albinucha), also known as the yellow-throated brush finch, is a species of bird in the family Passerellidae.

It is found in Colombia, Costa Rica, El Salvador, Guatemala, Honduras, Mexico, Nicaragua, and Panama. Its natural habitats are subtropical or tropical moist montane forests, subtropical or tropical high-altitude shrubland, and heavily degraded former forest.

References

white-naped brush finch
Birds of Central America
Birds of the Colombian Andes
white-naped brush finch
Taxonomy articles created by Polbot
Taxa named by Frédéric de Lafresnaye
Taxa named by Alcide d'Orbigny